Petr Hlídek (born 4 May 1962) is a Czech rower. He competed in the men's coxed four event at the 1988 Summer Olympics.

References

1962 births
Living people
Czech male rowers
Olympic rowers of Czechoslovakia
Rowers at the 1988 Summer Olympics
Sportspeople from Olomouc